Robert Sanford Brustein (born April 21, 1927) is an American theatrical critic, producer, playwright, writer, and educator. He founded both the Yale Repertory Theatre in New Haven, Connecticut, and the American Repertory Theater in Cambridge, Massachusetts, where he remains a creative consultant, and was the theatre critic for The New Republic. He comments on politics for the HuffPost.

Brustein is a senior research fellow at Harvard University and a distinguished scholar in residence at Suffolk University in Boston. He was elected to the American Academy of Arts and Letters in 1999, and in 2002, was inducted into the American Theater Hall of Fame. In 2003, he served as a senior fellow with the National Arts Journalism Program at Columbia University, and in 2004, and 2005, was a senior fellow at the National Endowment for the Arts Arts Journalism Institute in Theatre and Musical Theatre at the University of Southern California. In 2010, he was awarded the National Medal of Arts by President Barack Obama.

Life and career
Brustein was born in New York City. In elementary and high school, his dream was “to be Artie Shaw’s successor as a swing band leader.” He was educated at The High School of Music & Art, and Amherst College, where he received a BA in 1948 (briefly studying in the medieval history graduate program), the Yale School of Drama for a year studying dramatic literature and criticism, and Columbia University, where he received an MA in 1950, and a PhD in 1957, in dramatic literature and cultural criticism, supervised by Lionel Trilling. During this time, he served in the Merchant Marine on tankers and Victory ships, and later at Kings Point Academy on Long Island. He also held a Fulbright Fellowship to study in the United Kingdom from 1953 to 1955, where he directed plays at the University of Nottingham. After teaching at Cornell University, Vassar College, and Columbia, where he became a full professor of dramatic literature in the English department, he became Dean of the Yale School of Drama in 1966, and served in that position until 1979. It was during this period, in 1966, that he founded the Yale Repertory Theatre.

In 1979, Brustein left Yale for Harvard University, where he founded the American Repertory Theater (ART) and became a professor of English. At Harvard, he founded the Institute for Advanced Theater Training. He retired from the artistic directorship of ART in 2002, and now serves on the faculty of the institute. He has been a distinguished scholar in residence since 2007, at Suffolk University, where he teaches courses in Shakespeare Analysis. As the artistic director of Yale Rep from 1966 to 1979, and of ART from 1980 to 2002, Brustein supervised over 200 productions, acting in eight and directing twelve.

Critical writing
Brustein was the theatre critic for The New Republic from 1959 to "about 2000", and contributes to the Huffington Post. He is the author of sixteen books on theatre and society:

1964: The Theatre of Revolt: An Approach to Modern Drama (Little, Brown)  – essays on Ibsen, Strindberg, Chekhov, Shaw, Brecht, Pirandello, O'Neill, and Artaud and Genet, considered a "standard critical text on modern drama"
1965: Seasons of Discontent: Dramatic Opinions 1959–1965 (Simon and Schuster) ISBN none – "an assemblage of his best magazine pieces from 1959 to [1965]"
1969: The Third Theatre (Knopf)  – "a collection of pieces written between 1957 and 1968 ... that deal not only with theatre but also with literature, culture, and the movies" (from the Preface).
1971: Revolution as Theatre: Notes on the New Radical Style (Liveright)  – examines campus turmoil, radicalism versus liberalism, the fate of the free university, the new revolutionary life style, the decadence of American society, and the sentimentality and false emotionalism of radical alternatives
1975: The Culture Watch: Essays on Theatre and Society, 1969–1974  (Knopf)  – "As far as these bristling exhortations go, well, you have to wish the gadfly well"
1980: Critical Moments: Reflection on Theatre & Society, 1973–1979 (Random House) ISBN 0394510933 – "Can the Show Go On?", "The Future of the Endowments", "The Artist and the Citizen" and other essays on the state of American theatre.
1981: Making Scenes: A Personal History of the Turbulent Years at Yale, 1966–1979 (Random House)  – Brustein looks at his time at Yale as part "of a larger social and cultural pattern"
1987: Who Needs Theatre: Dramatic Opinions (Atlantic Monthly)  – a collection of reviews and essays including "an assessment of hits like 'Cats' and '42nd Street', Polish theatre, drama on apartheid and the Broadway vogue for British imports."
1991: Reimagining American Theatre (Hill & Wang)  – reviews and essays, mostly from The New Republic considering the state of American theater in the 1980s.
1994: Dumbocracy in America: Studies in the Theatre of Guilt, 1987–1994 (Ivan R. Dee)  – "uses the prism of the American theatre to explore the motivating impulses behind rampant political correctness and to assess government efforts to regulate the arts"
1998: Cultural Calisthenics: Writings on Race, Politics, and Theatre (Ivan R. Dee)  – "Many of these essays ... are concerned with how "extra-artistic considerations'" – multiculturalism, gay rights, women's issues and political correctness – impair current thought, including that of arts funding agencies."
2001: The Siege of the Arts: Collected Writings, 1994–2001 (Ivan R. Dee)  – "The opening essays lead the charge against The Three Horsemen of the Anti-Culture: political, moral, and middlebrow aesthetic correctness ... allied with corporate capitalism and a rigid multiculturalism"
2005: Letters to a Young Actor: A Universal Guide to Performance (Basic Books)  – "A guidebook for performers on stage and screen [which] aims to inspire struggling dramatists and also reinvigorate the very state of the art of acting itself."
2006: Millennial Stages: Essays and Reviews 2001–2005 (Yale Univ. Press)  – "examines crucial issues relating to theater in the post-9/11 years, analyzing specific plays, emerging and established performers, and theatrical production throughout the world"
2009: The Tainted Muse: Prejudices and Preconceptions in Shakespeare's Works and Times "an untainted lens through which to see Shakespeare as never before"
2011: Rants and Raves: Opinions, Tributes, and Elegies
2014: Winter Passages: Essays and Criticism

Brustein was the writer and narrator of a WNET television series in 1966 called The Opposition Theatre.  He also comments on contemporary social and political issues for the Huffington Post.

Conflict with August Wilson
In 1996 and 1997, Brustein was involved in an extended public debate – through their essays, speeches and personal appearances – with African-American playwright August Wilson about multiculturalism, color-blind casting, and other issues where race impacts on the craft and practice of theatre in America.

Other Conflicts
Brustein criticized the not-for-profit theaters for developing commercial work and becoming tryout houses for Broadway. His fellow directors of regional theaters felt betrayed. A series of articles and letters followed in the New York Times and elsewhere. Critics from the Boston Globe and the Boston Phoenix attacked Brustein for his dual roles as producer/director and theater critic, calling it a conflict of interest. The critic Davi Napoleon wrote an essay that included quotations from other critics who said that Brustein's dual roles made him uniquely qualified to review theater with insight and intelligence. Napoleon pointed out that while Brustein sometimes reviewed colleagues and former students, he did not always review them favorably.

Playwright
As a playwright, Brustein has both authored plays and adapted the material of other authors.

Adaptations
During his tenure at ART, Brustein wrote eleven adaptations, including Henrik Ibsen's The Wild Duck, The Master Builder, and When We Dead Awaken, the last directed by Robert Wilson; Three Farces and a Funeral, adapted from the works and life of Anton Chekhov; Luigi Pirandello's Enrico IV; and Brustein's final production at ART, Lysistrata by Aristophanes, directed by Andrei Serban.

Adaptations which he also directed while at ART include a Pirandello trilogy: Six Characters in Search of an Author, which won the Boston Theatre Award for Best Production of 1996, Right You Are (If You Think You Are), and Tonight We Improvise; Ibsen's Ghosts, Chekhov's The Cherry Orchard, Strindberg's The Father, and Thomas Middleton's The Changeling.

Brustein also conceived and adapted the musical Shlemiel the First, based on the stories of Isaac Bashevis Singer and set to traditional klezmer music, which was directed and choreographed by David Gordon. After the original presentation in 1994 at ART and in Philadelphia at the American Music Theatre Festival, who co-produced the show, Shlemiel the First was revived several times in Cambridge and subsequently played at the Lincoln Center Serious Fun Festival, the American Conservatory Theater in San Francisco, and the Geffen Playhouse in Los Angeles, as well as touring theatres on the east coast of Florida and in Stamford, Connecticut. The play has also been produced at Theater J in Washington, D.C..  A remount of the original David Gordon production was presented by Peak Performances at Montclair State University's Kasser Theatre in January 2010, and went on to a three-week run at New York University's Skirball Center for the Performing Arts.

Brustein's new klezmer musical, with composer Hankus Netsky, The King of Second Avenue, an adaptation of Israel Zangwill's The King of the Schnorrers, was produced at the New Repertory Theatre in 2015.

Original works
Brustein's full-length plays include Demons, Nobody Dies on Friday, The Face Lift, Spring Forward, Fall Back, and his Shakespeare Trilogy The English Channel, Mortal Terror, and "The Last Will."

Demons, which was broadcast on WGBH radio in 1993, had its stage world premiere as part of the American Repertory Theater New Stages Season. Nobody Dies on Friday was given its world premiere in the same series and was presented at the Singapore Arts Festival and the Pushkin Theatre in Moscow. It was included in Marisa Smith's anthology New Playwrights: Best Plays of 1998.

Spring Forward, Fall Back was produced in 2006 at the Vineyard Playhouse on Martha's Vineyard and at Theater J in Washington. The English Channel was produced at the C. Walsh Theatre of Suffolk University in Boston and at the Vineyard Playhouse in the fall of 2007. In the Fall of 2008, it played at the Abingdon Theatre in New York where it was nominated for a Pulitzer Prize.

His short plays Poker Face, Chekhov on Ice, Divestiture, AnchorBimbo, Noises, Terrorist Skit, Airport Hell, Beachman's Last Poetry Reading, "Sex For a Change", and Kosher Kop were all presented by the Boston Playwrights' Theatre and form a play called "Seven/Elevens.

Brustein is also the author of Doctor Hippocrates is Out: Please Leave a Message an anthology of theatrical and cinematic satire on medicine and physicians, commissioned by the Institute for Healthcare Improvement for its 2008 convention in Nashville. Brustein's musical satire, Exposed, was performed in 2014 at the Martha's Vineyard Playhouse.

Awards and honors
Brustein has been the recipient of many awards and honors, including:

 c.1953: Fulbright Fellowship to the University of Nottingham, 1953–1955
 1961: John Simon Guggenheim Memorial Foundation Fellowship
 1962, 1987: Twice winner of the George Jean Nathan Award for Dramatic Criticism: in 1962 for his reviews in Commentary, Partisan Review, Harpers and New Republic; and in 1987 for Who Needs Theatre: Dramatic Opinions. Brustein is the only person to have received this award more than once.
 1964: George Polk Award for Journalism (Criticism)
 1984: the 2nd Elliot Norton Award For Professional Excellence in Boston Theatre, known at the time as the Norton Prize, presented by the Boston Theater District Association, and now given by StageSource: the Greater Boston Theatre Alliance
 1985: New England Theatre Conference's Major Award for outstanding creative achievement in the American theatre
 1995: American Academy of Arts and Letters Award for Distinguished Service to the Arts
 1999: Elected to the American Academy of Arts and Letters
 2000: Association for Theatre in Higher Education Career Achievement Award for Professional Theatre
 2001: The Commonwealth Award for Organizational Leadership (Massachusetts' highest honor)
 2002: Inducted into the American Theatre Hall of Fame
 2003: United States Institute for Theatre Technology Lifetime Achievement Award
 2003: National Corporate Theatre Fund chairman's Award for Achievement in Theatre
 2005: Gann Academy Award for Excellence in the Performing Arts
 2008: Eugene O'Neill Foundation's Tao House Award for serving the American theatre with distinction
 2010: National Medal of Arts
 2011: Players Club Hall of Fame

In addition, Brustein received the Pirandello Medal, and a medal from the Egyptian government for contributions to world theatre. His papers are housed at the Howard Gotlieb Archival Research Center at Boston University.

See also
American Repertory Theater
Yale Repertory Theatre

References
Notes

Bibliography
Plotkins, Marilyn J. The American Repertory Theatre Reference Book: The Brustein Years, 2005.

External links

Robert Brustein on Huffington Post
Robert Brustein bio on the ART website
Robert Brustein in the New York Times index
Robert Brustein on Google Books
The American Repertory Theater's website

1927 births
Living people
Alumni of the University of Nottingham
20th-century American dramatists and playwrights
Jewish American writers
American theater critics
American theatre directors
American theatre managers and producers
Amherst College alumni
Columbia University alumni
Harvard University faculty
Members of the American Academy of Arts and Letters
United States National Medal of Arts recipients
The High School of Music & Art alumni
20th-century American non-fiction writers
Yale School of Drama alumni
21st-century American Jews